The Island on Bird Street (The Island on Birds Street) is a 1981 semi-autobiographical children's book by Israeli author Uri Orlev, which tells the story of a young boy, Alex, and his struggle to survive alone in a ghetto during World War II. The author won the 1996 Hans Christian Andersen Award for children's literature, largely for this book, which was translated into numerous languages and adapted into a play and a film. The English translation, by Hillel Halkin, was published in 1984.

Plot summary
Alex (the main character) is an 11-year-old Jewish boy living in a Ghetto in German-occupied Poland during World War II with his father and their friend, Boruch. German soldiers come into the Ghetto and send people into trains to be taken away (most likely to death camps). Alex and his father get separated, and soon Alex has to learn how to kill time in the empty ghetto by himself. As it turns out the ghetto is not entirely empty, and that is where he comes across various people, from neighbors to robbers, some of whom even try to help him. He finds himself in an abandoned, bombed out building on Bird Street (Ptasia street) where he seeks refuge. The only thing he has to pass the time away with is his pet mouse Snow, the novel Robinson Crusoe and other books, and a small air vent grate overlooking the town. He has to hunt for food on his own and still stay hidden from soldiers. It is a great test for Alex to see if he can make it through tough conditions, and also wait for the arrival of his father.

Adaptation to feature film

In 1997, the book was made into a feature film starring Jordan Kiziuk, Patrick Bergin and Jack Warden.

See also

 Robinson Crusoes of Warsaw

1981 novels
1981 children's books
20th-century Israeli novels
Children's historical novels
Young adult novels
Autobiographical novels
Novels about the Holocaust
Novels set in Poland
Israeli novels adapted into films